Orocovis (from Taino language, Orocobix popularly thought to mean "remembrance of the first mountain") is a town and municipality of Puerto Rico located in the Central Mountain Range, north of Villalba and Coamo; south of Morovis and Corozal; southeast of Ciales; east of Jayuya; and west of Barranquitas. Orocovis is spread over 17 barrios and Orocovis Pueblo (the downtown area and the administrative center of the city). It is part of the San Juan-Caguas-Guaynabo Metropolitan Statistical Area.

History
Since before the Spanish colonization in the 16th century, the Taíno were already established in the region. They were led by the cacique Orocobix and his tribe known as the Jatibonicu. After Spaniards settled in the island, the region was part of the south of Manatí and the north region of Coamo. By 1823 Orocovis was a barrio of Barranquitas while Morovis (previously part of Manatí) had a barrio called Barros.  Both Orocovis and Barros were eventually united to establish a new town.

On May 25, 1825, the neighbors of the region granted don Juan de Rivera y Santiago the power to request the Governor authorization to found a municipality in the Barros area, where they had bought 14 acres of land from doña Eulalia (Olaya) de Rivera Melendez, who donated an additional acre to establish several municipal works. However, due to the distance from bodies of water, the settlement was moved to another place where it is today. On November 10, 1825, Governor Miguel de la Torre granted permission to found the new municipality of Barros.

In 1838, the parish of San Juan Bautista de Barros was created and was blessed and inaugurated on October 29 of the same year. However, in 1875, a fire destroyed the church, the King's House, the priest's house and several homes.

Most of Orocovis nicknames stem from its location in the center of the island. Some of them are: "Corazón de Puerto Rico" (Heart of Puerto Rico) and "Centro Geográfico de Puerto Rico" (Geographical Center of Puerto Rico). Locals say the center of Puerto Rico is in a barrio called Pellejas, on Road 566, Km 5.7 in Orocovis. That the center of Puerto Rico is in front of the Catholic church was determined to be false by engineers from the University of Puerto Rico, Mayagüez Campus.

Puerto Rico was ceded by Spain in the aftermath of the Spanish–American War under the terms of the Treaty of Paris of 1898 and became a territory of the United States. In 1899, the United States Department of War conducted a census of Puerto Rico finding that the population of Barros, as Orocovis was then called, was 14,845.

In 1928, the Legislative Assembly of Puerto Rico approved a resolution to change the name of Barros to Orocovis, to honor the Taíno cacique of the same name, who lived in that region.

Geography
The municipality Orocovis is mountainous with many valleys. Most of the Orocovis terrain runs through the Cordillera Central of the island. Most of the high peaks are in the southern region of the municipality within the limits of the municipality with Villalba and Coamo. The highest peak of the town is Cerro Mogote.

The rivers Toro Negro, Sana Muertos, Orocovis, Matrullas, and Bauta, and the creeks Doña Juana, Palmar and Cacaos are among the water bodies in the town. There are two lakes: El Guineo, a reservoir of the Toro Negro River, and the Matrullas Lake formed by the Bauta River. El Guineo is Puerto Rico's highest lake.

Barrios

Like all municipalities of Puerto Rico, Orocovis is subdivided into barrios.

Barros
Orocovis 
Pueblo
Ala de la Piedra
Bauta Abajo
Bauta Arriba
Bermejales
Botijas
Cacaos
Collores
Damián Abajo
Damián Arriba
Gato
Mata de Cañas
Pellejas 
Sabana
Saltos

Sectors
Barrios (which are like minor civil divisions) and subbarrios, in turn, are further subdivided into smaller local populated place areas/units called sectores (sectors in English). The types of sectores may vary, from normally sector to urbanización to reparto to barriada to residencial, among others.

Special Communities

 (Special Communities of Puerto Rico) are marginalized communities whose citizens are experiencing a certain amount of social exclusion. A map shows these communities occur in nearly every municipality of the commonwealth.

Energy consortium
An Energy Consortium was signed in late February, 2019 by Villalba, Orocovis, Morovis, Ciales and Barranquitas municipalities. The consortium is the first of its kind for the island. It is intended to have municipalities work together to safeguard and create resilient, and efficient energy networks, with backups for their communities.

Culture

"The Musical Capital of Puerto Rico"
Orocovis is sometimes called "The Musical Capital of Puerto Rico" because many major Puerto Rican performers were either born or raised in the town, particularly bandleader Bobby Valentín, folk singer Andrés Jiménez, merengue singer Manny Manuel, salsa legend William "H. Christ" Corchado, and the Colón-Zayas family of musicians, which includes Emma (singer, multi-instrumentalist) and Edwin (a cuatro player).

Santo (art figurines)

Celestino Avilés Meléndez (1925-2004), a santero from Orocovis, saved the dying art from his workshop. Santeros are folk artists who create wooden, religious statuettes called Santos. The folk artists were dispersed around Puerto Rico and were few in number. Aviles' initiative, in 1983, for santeros to meet continues to this day with the  taking place in Orocovis, the third week in December annually.

Tourism

Bosque Estatal de Toro Negro
Las Piscinas del Area Recreativa Doña Juana (Doña Juana Pool, Spring Water and Recreative Park)
Las Cabañas de Doña Juana (Ribs restaurant)
Área Recreativa de Damián (Recreative park of Damian)
Ríos (rivers)
Vistas Panorámicas (panoramic views)
Toro Verde Nature Adventure Park

Landmarks and places of interest

"El Monstruo" at Toro Verde Nature Adventure Park in Orocovis came in third for longest zip line in the world in 2018, at 2530 m (8,300 ft).
Indian Cave
Matrullas Lake
El Guineo Lake
Orocovis Museum
Taíno Refuge
Mirador Villalba - Orocovis
Toro Negro State Forest
Área Recreativa Cerro La Guaira (Recreative Park)
Salto Doña Juana (Doña Juana Water Fall)
Toro Verde Nature Adventure Park

Festivals and events
Orocovis celebrates its patron saint festival in June. The  is a religious and cultural celebration that generally features parades, games, artisans, amusement rides, regional food, and live entertainment.

Other festivals and events celebrated in Orocovis include:
 Children's Theater Festival – April
 Shrimp Festival – July
 Artisan Fair – September
 Youth Festival – October
 Puerto Rican National Meat Pie Festival – November

Economy

Agriculture
Cattle, coffee, fruits, tobacco, and wheat. A young business growing hydroponics lettuce was in negotiations to be a supplier for Walmart in 2019.

Industrial
Several small nutritional product industries.

Demographics 

According to the 2000 census, Orocovis has a population of 23,844 with a population density is 378.4 people per square mile (145.5/km2). Although there was a decline in the population during the 1980s, it has steadily increased during the last decades.

Statistics taken from the 2000 census shows that 81.4% of Orocoveños have Spanish or White origin, 4.1% are black, 0.4% are Amerindian etc.

Government

All municipalities in Puerto Rico are administered by a mayor, elected every four years. Jesús Colón Berlingeri (of the New Progressive Party) has served as mayor since 1998.

The city belongs to the Puerto Rico Senatorial district VI, which is represented by two senators. In 2012, Miguel Pereira Castillo and Angel M. Rodríguez were elected as district senators.

Education
Orocovis has several public and private schools and public education is administered by the Puerto Rico Department of Education.

Transportation
There is no direct highway connection to Orocovis. Roads #137 and #155 lead from the north, while roads #138 and #155 lead from the south. Orocovis lies at about an hour and a half from San Juan, the capital of Puerto Rico.

There are 17 bridges in Orocovis.

Symbols
The  has an official flag and coat of arms.

Flag of Orocovis
The Flag of Orocovis is formed by five vertical stripes: Two green stripes at the ends, representing the territories of Aibonito and Barranquitas; and a blue one in the center representing the regional domain of the cacique Orocobix prior to the Spanish colonization. These stripes are divided by two narrower white stripes, representing the territories granted by Barranquitas and Morovis to form the municipality in 1825.

Over the blue portion there's an oval with a Sun. The Sun has seventeen rays that represent the different regions of the town. The Sun, being the center of the Solar System, represents Orocovis as the center of the island of Puerto Rico.

Coat of arms
The oval is symbol of the letter "O", initial of the name of the town. In each quadrant appear representative elements of the town. In the left superior quadrant a Taíno Indian bust, symbol of the great "Chief Orocobix" and the Indian heritage of the town, silhouetted in gold on a silver-plated background. The Indian bust faces to the star or sun that appears in the superior right quadrant, which is in gold on a blue background and represents the territorial municipality with its seventeen rays or demarcations. In the inferior right quadrant, a plantain plant is observed representing the agriculture, silhouetted in gold on a silver-plated background. A bridge also silhouetted in gold on a blue background, above the river appears in the left inferior quadrant.

See also

List of Puerto Ricans
History of Puerto Rico
Did you know-Puerto Rico?

References

Further reading

External links 
Disfruta Orocovis
Puerto Rico Government Directory - Orocovis

Municipalities of Puerto Rico
San Juan–Caguas–Guaynabo metropolitan area
Populated places established in 1772
1772 establishments in the Spanish West Indies
1770s establishments in Puerto Rico
Energy in Puerto Rico